Kericho is the biggest town in Kericho County located in the highlands west of the Kenyan Rift Valley. Standing on the edge of the Mau Forest, Kericho has a warm and temperate climate making it an ideal location for agriculture and in particular, the large scale cultivation of tea.

The town is strategically located along Kenya's western tourism circuit with access to Lake Victoria, the Maasai Mara National Reserve and Ruma National Park.

As of the 1999 census, the town has a population of 150,000. Kericho is the home town of the Kipsigis, who are a part of the Kalenjin people.

Etymology
The etymology of Kericho is unclear. One theory has it that it was home to the region's first hospital, built by the colonial British at the start of the 20th century. Other theories have it that the town was named for a local medicine man called Kipkerich or after a Maasai chief, Ole Kericho who was killed in the 18th century by the Abagusii.

History
The settlement at Kericho was founded in 1902 by British settlers.

Kericho hosts Africa's largest Sikh Gurudwara and the second largest Catholic cathedral in Kenya.

Gurdwara Sahib is built on the site of the home and workshop of Kericho Wagon Works founder Sant Baba Puran Singh Ji of Kericho. The site is currently a place of worship for the Sikh community and a museum gazetted by the Government of Kenya as a place of spiritual significance.

It is dedicated to the memory of Sant Baba Puran Singh Ji, founder of the international charitable organization, Guru Nanak Nishkam Sewak Jatha which promotes the spirit and practice of selfless service ("nishkam sewa") in the name of Guru Nanak Dev Ji, the founder of the Sikh faith.

Chandarana Records a pioneer of Benga music and the Kenyan music recording industry is based in Kericho town.

Kericho is home to Olympic-winning long-distance athletes and hosts Zoo Kericho F.C. a football club competing in the Kenyan Premier League and Kericho R.F.C. competing in the Nationwide League.

Other notable places of interest include Chagaik Arboretum, Chelimo Arboretum, Tagabi Arboretum, Uhuru Garden and the vast scenic tea estates with high ground view points.

Geography 
Kericho is reputed to hold the record for the highest number of hail occurrences in a year, either at 132 days with hail or 113 days in 1965. Kericho has up to 50 days of hail each year, but large hail is rare.

Government

Kericho town is the headquarters of Kericho county, which is itself made up of six constituencies/sub-counties including BBureti, Belgut, Ainamoi, Soin/ Sigowet, Kipkelion East, and Kipkelion West.

Transport

Kericho is accessible by road through the B1 road (Kenya) that links Mau-Summit, Kericho to Kisumu and Busia. In addition, the C25 Kapsoit-Sondu road connects Kericho to the A1 road (Kenya) linking Isebania to Lokichoggio through Kisumu and Kitale.

The Nakuru-Kisumu railway line passes through Kericho County with railway stations at Mau Summit, Londiani, Kedowa, Lumbwa, Kipkelion and Fort Ternan. Fort Ternan was previously used as a halfway point for passenger and goods trains between Nakuru and Kisumu.

Private airstrips operated by tea estates have a more regular use for purposes of crop spraying.

Communication and media

Kericho town has access to a high-speed fiber-optic Internet connection, fixed line, and mobile telecommunications.

There are several local FM radio stations including Kass FM, Chamgei FM, KBC Kitwek FM, Radio Injili, Sayare Radio, Light and Life FM, Sema Radio and The Just FM.

Tertiary education

Kericho hosts several satellite campuses and colleges providing certificate, diploma and degree courses.

 University of Kabianga
 Kenya Highlands Evangelical University run by the Africa Gospel Church
 Kenyatta University
 The University of Nairobi
 Kericho Teachers Training College offers degree courses under agreement with Moi University
 Eland College run jointly by Kabarak University and Eland Schools
 Mospen Institute of Development Studies(MIDS)
 African Institute of Research and Development Studies (AIRADS) 
 Nishkam Saint Puran Singh Institute (NSPSI)
 Kericho Technical Institute
 Kericho School of Professional Studies
 Kenya Institute of Management
Rift Valley Institute of Business Studies

Secondary education

Kericho is home to:
1.Litein High School,
2.Taita Towett Boys High School, 
3.Kipkelion Girls High school, 
4.Kapsoit high school, 
5.Kabianga High School, 
6.Kericho High school, 
7.Moi Tea Secondary, 
8.Kipsigis Girls High School, 
9.Cheptenye Boys High School, 
10.Kericho Tea Boys, 
11.Tengecha schools 
12. Moi Sitotwet 
13. Getumbe Secondary school 
14. Poiywek Secondary School 
15. Kericho Day Secondary school 
16. Kipchimchim Secondary school
17. Kaptebeswet  secondary school and others

Religion

Kericho is home to followers of the Africa Gospel Church, Full Gospel Church, Seventh-day Adventists, Catholics, Sikhs, Muslims, Hindus, African Inland Church, Jehovah's Witnesses and Anglicans.

Notable people
 Dr. Taitta Toweett,Named after Taita Towett High school
 Joseph Cheruiyot arap Chewen
 Joginder Singh
 Hannington Apudo, the first indigenous military pilot in the Kenya Air Force
 Wilson Kiprugut
 Moses Kiprono arap Keino
 Joyce Chepchumba
 Edwin Soi
Kipngeno arap Ng'eny 
 David Kimutai Too
 Ayub Kiprotich Siele, The longest serving mayor of Kericho

References 

Kericho County
Populated places in Rift Valley Province
County capitals in Kenya